Lange Island is the largest of the Bastian Islands in the Svalbard archipelago. It lies east of Wilhelm Island and northeast of Spitsbergen.

The northwest end of the island is named Dove Spit and the southwest end Lange Point (literally 'Lange Fishtail'). The wildlife consists largely of polar bears.

The Bastian Islands were discovered in 1867 by the Swedish-Norwegian polar explorer Nils Fredrik Rønnbeck, who was the first to sail around Spitsbergen. Most of the Bastian Islands were named during the First German North Polar Expedition in 1868, led by Carl Koldewey. One might assume the physical shape of the island to be the origin of its name (from Norwegian lang 'long'); however, the island is in fact named after Henry Lange, a German cartographer and publisher of many maps and an atlas.

References

Islands of Svalbard